Tushar Dalvi is an Indian film and television actor. He has acted in Marathi and Hindi films. His first film role was in Jivalaga. He has won many awards and was nominated on several occasions. He has also done roles in various Hindi television serials, like Kshitij Ye Nahi, Mrs. Madhuri Dixit, Phir Bhi Dil Hai Hindustani, Hari Mirchi Lal Mirchi, Devon Ke Dev...Mahadev. He has also appeared in episodes of a few Hindi television shows, such as Kanoon, Ssshhhh...Phir Koi Hai and Lakhon Mein Ek.

Filmography

Films

Plays
Ojhyawina Pravasi
Ha Shekhar Khosla Kon Aahe
Hamlet

Television

References

External links

Living people
Indian male film actors
Male actors in Marathi cinema
Male actors in Hindi cinema
Indian male television actors
Male actors in Hindi television
1952 births
Male actors from Mumbai
Male actors in Marathi television